Daniel Holt is an American politician who is currently the Hawaii state representative in Hawaii's 29th district. He won the seat after incumbent Democrat Karl Rhoads decided not to run for reelection in 2016. He defeated several Democratic candidates in the District 29 primaries and won against Republican Kaiwiola Coakley in the general election. He ran for District 29 in 2012 as well, losing in a primary election to incumbent Karl Rhoads.

References

Living people
Democratic Party members of the Hawaii House of Representatives
21st-century American politicians
Year of birth missing (living people)
Politicians from Honolulu